The Postplatz is a central square in Dresden and an important traffic junction, especially for local public transport. It is located in the old town not far from the Zwinger.

Most routes of the night bus service GuteNachtLinie operated by DVB meet here at the same time to allow people to switch routes.

References 

Squares in Dresden
19th-century architecture in Germany
Streets in Dresden